John Camp may refer to:

Politicians
John E. Camp (1915–1988), Iowa state representative
John H. Camp (1840–1892), U.S. Representative from New York
John Lafayette Camp (1828–1891), Texas state senator
John Lafayette Camp, Jr. (1855–1918), Texas state senator
John Newbold Camp (1908–1987), U.S. Representative from Oklahoma
John Camp (English politician), MP for Cambridge (UK Parliament constituency)

Other
John Sandford (novelist) a.k.a. John Camp (born 1944), Pulitzer Prize–winning journalist and novelist